The Russian route A164, also known as Transkam Highway, is a Russian federal highway. A164 highway is a part of Transcaucasian Highway, connecting southern Russia and Georgia. Before 2018, the route was designated R297 and R298.

Previous route
The A164 designation was used on a route from Kultuk via Mondy to the Mongolian border. This route is now A333.

Gallery

References 

Roads in Russia